Revolutionary Communist (Revolutionary Communists), in addition to its direct meaning of "Communist revolutionary" may refer to members of the following parties:

Revolutionary Communists (1918-1920) in Soviet Russia
Revolutionary Communist Group (disambiguation)
Revolutionary Communist League (disambiguation)
Revolutionary Communist Organisation (disambiguation)
Revolutionary Communist Party
Revolutionary Communist Youth (disambiguation)
Organization of Communist Revolutionaries, an Iranian Maoist organization
The members of Russian Communist Workers' Party – Revolutionary Party of Communists are also called "Revolutionary Communists"